My Heart Puppy  is a 2022 South Korean film directed by Jason Kim, starring Yoo Yeon-seok and Cha Tae-hyun. The film revolves around two men who are going to be separated from their family-like pet dog, and their journey to find a new owner. It was released theatrically on March 1, 2023.

Synopsis 
Min-soo (Yoo Yeon-seok) is an ordinary office worker who dreams of a perfect family. He has a dog, Rooney, whom he treats as a younger brother. Unexpected circumstances arise in Min-soo's life, when he can no longer live with Rooney ahead of his marriage with his fiancée who is allergic to dogs. Together with his cousin, Jin-guk (Cha Tae-hyun) who owns a cafe that went bankrupt, Min-soo decides to find a new family for Rooney. On their journey that starts in Seoul and continues to Jeju Island to find the perfect owner, the two encounter the heartbreaking reality of abandoned pets.

Cast 
 Yoo Yeon-seok as Min-soo
 Cha Tae-hyun as Jin-guk
 Jung In-sun as Seong-gyeong, Min-soo's girlfriend
 Kang Shin-il as Jin-guk's uncle
 Park Jin-joo as the first interviewee
 Woo Do-hwan as the husband of  the first interviewee
 Tae Won-seok as the second interviewee
 Jung Ji-hoon as middle school student
 Kim Ji-young as director of the abandoned dog center
 Ryu Soo-young as a father
 Lee Ho-jung as girl on boat
 Kim Yoo-jung as Ah-min

Production

Development 
Director-screenwriter Jason Kim wrote the story of the film based on his experience of separating from his dog, which he had been raising since childhood. Rooney, the name of the pet dog in the film, is also the name of his dog. Kim began writing the script of the film in 2018.

Casting and filming 
Initially, in June 2019, Choi Woo-sik and Gong Myung were confirmed to star in the movie and the filming was expected to start in the second half of that year. But in August 2019, it was reported that production companies had decided to step down from the film and the production was put on hold. Later, Choi and Gong withdrew from the project.

In March 2020, Cha Tae-hyun was confirmed to appear in the film, Yoo Yeon-seok joined the film in May and filming began in June. The film reunited actors Cha and Yoo after their 2008 drama General Hospital 2.

Director Kim revealed that actors Cha and Yoo agreed to lower the amount they would normally get paid for appearing in the film, while Kim Yoo-jung, who makes a cameo appearance, stars in the film without pay.

Release 
The film was selected as the closing film of the 5th Seoul Animal Film Festival where it premiered on October 31, 2022. It was released on March 1, 2023, in theatres in South Korea.

References

External links
 
 
 
 

2020s Korean-language films
2020s South Korean films
Films about dogs
Films set in Jeju
South Korean comedy films
2022 comedy films